Anna Maria Lenngren, née Malmstedt (18 June 1754 – 8 March 1817) was one of the most famous poets in Swedish history. Her father and brother were also poets.

One of her best-known poems is Några ord till min kära dotter, ifall jag hade någon ("Advice to my dear daughter, if I had one"). She also wrote on Sweden's class system in the satirical poems against snobbery Hans nåds morgonsömn ("His Grace's morning snooze") and Grevinnans besök ("The Countess's visit").

Life

Early life
Anna Maria Lenngren was born in Uppsala as the daughter of the poet Magnus Brynolf Malmstedt (1724–1798), a professor in Latin at Uppsala University, and Märta Johanna Florin (d. 1788). Her father was a member of the Moravian Church and was known for his social work; from 1772, he hosted a school for poor children in his home. Both her parents published hymns, and her brother Johan Magnus (1749–80) wrote secular poems.

Anna Maria Lenngren became set against religion and in favor of the realism of the age of enlightenment through dislike of her father's passionate religious feelings; but her humanism and passion for social justice have also been attributed to her father's influence. In her social views, she felt sympathy for the working classes, opposed the privileges of the nobility and acted as a spokesperson for the "third estate", idealizing a simple and humble life style.

Her father observed her talent early on, and stated that he wished to "make of her not only a literary, but a learned woman". He gave her an advanced education, and she was tutored at home in Latin and the Classics of antiquity. Her favorite poet was Horace.

Early career
She began her career in poetry with reviews, epitomes, epigrams and translations in the 1770s. Among her earliest works were interpretations of Horace, published anonymously in the press. In 1772, she published her first poem under her own name, the funeral poem . In 1774–77, she frequently wrote for Anna Hammar-Rosén's paper .

In 1776 she was commissioned by Duke Charles, the King of Sweden's brother, for a translation of the French operetta Lucile, the first French operetta translated into Swedish. In its introduction, she defended women's right to intellectual work. It was a success: Lenngren was awarded a golden clock as a token of appreciation by the royal Duchess Charlotte, and was given several similar translation commissions by the royal house.

Lenngren enjoyed great success: already in 1774, she was inducted into a literary society in Uppsala, earned good reviews and poetic tributes in the press, became known as a defender of intellectual women, and referred to herself as a "litterata". She became a member of the Royal Society of Sciences and Letters in Gothenburg in 1775, and of the Utile Dulci in 1779. She was one of only three women members of the Utile Dulci, the others being Anna Charlotta von Stapelmohr and Anna Brita Wendelius. In 1777, she repeated her demand in favor of women's right to intellectual pursuits in Thé-conseillen.

Married life
In 1780, she married the official Carl Peter Lenngren (1750–1827). Kellgren worked with Lenngren on several assignments from 1778 onwards, reportedly providing her with inspiration, and sharing an interest in the ideas of Voltaire.

Her marriage caused a great change in her life. After her wedding, she officially stopped being active in the literary world, publishing under pseudonyms, renouncing her previous stand in favor of women's intellectual and literary emancipation, and arguing that women should avoid literary pursuits in favor of developing their character as suitable wives and mothers. Whether she was honest in this change of opinion, or was using irony to make a point, has been the subject of debate. Lenngren came to admire Rousseau, and may have come to support his ideas of the role of women in the 1780s, views further supported by the religious values of simplicity and humility in her childhood home. Ingrid Arvidsson argued that Lenngren had a deeply ambivalent view on the subject, affected by her personality: "The fact that Mrs L was hurt by criticism is evident in several of her poems, but she did also have the more unusual sensitivity of being hurt by admiration".

After her marriage, she hosted a literary salon, which became a center of cultural debate frequented by Gustaf af Leopold, Nils von Rosenstein, Frans Michael Franzén and Gudmund Jöran Adlerbeth. During these years she is described as witty and intelligent but humble and modest.

Her spouse was described as "principally known as useful and boring", but the marriage was a happy one, and she used to take him to the Utile Dulci Academy and sing with him. She had no children, but adopted a daughter. In 1797 the daughter was placed in a mental asylum, but died soon after her admission, an event which affected Lenngren deeply, as did the death of her father, who drowned under suspicious circumstances in 1798.

In 1790, another great change occurred when Johan Henric Kellgren discontinued his literary production because of an illness. However, she insisted on staying anonymous and refused to officially resume her career, although unofficially her pseudonyms were known and she was known as the writer of the work which she published during these years, though she insisted on remaining officially anonymous.

Her salon at Beridarebansgatan was the center of the Royal Swedish Academy, and though she was never a formal member, they called her their "invisible member". She declined their admiration with the poem  ("Dream"), in which she described how the poet Hedvig Charlotta Nordenflycht had appeared to her and deemed her unworthy. However, she signed  with her own name, the first that she had written under her own name since her marriage, and her last.

Lenngren died of breast cancer aged 62, and was buried in Stockholm's Klara kyrka cemetery.

Literary career
Anna Maria Lenngren debuted as a writer of poems for funerals and weddings, and her earliest work has a tone of the ecstatic passion common in the religious circles of her father. This was however quickly replaced by a more sober tone in line with the scientific sense and realism of the age of enlightenment.

As a writer, Lenngren frequently used satire, sarcasm, and irony, and she often made parodied the genre of pastoral, opera and ballad. Her verse was often short, portraying everyday life, almost always in a city environment, and she criticized artificiality and lack of genuine value behind the facade. Ideologically, she was inspired by her personal friend and colleague Johan Henric Kellgren, with whom she often worked from 1778 onward. Fredrik Böök says that "there was every word needed and no more, almost no adjectives. She painted with only verbs and substantives", and Snoilsky writes in his poem  ("An evening at Mrs Lenngren's"): "It's like a burdock, this witty meter".

Her successful early career during the 1770s was influenced by her feminist ideas, foremost her defense of women's right to participate and engage in intellectual work. This is most evident in the forewords of her translation of Lucile (1776) and her poem  (1777).

Her radical change in views on the role of women, which took place in her work after her marriage in 1780, has been the subject of much debate. In her poem  ("Advice to my dear daughter, if I had one") and '', she advice women to renounce intellectual aspirations and focus on shaping their character morally to that on an ideal wife and mother. She advice women to concentrate on domestic tasks rather than attempt to meddle in intellectual or political pursuits, because "Our household is our Republic; our politics is our appearance". She herself officially discontinued her career after her marriage by only publishing her works under anonymous pseudonyms and refusing to admit to them. However, Anna Maria Lenngren is famed for her great love for irony, which has created uncertainty about whether she meant what she said literary or if she wished to prove her point by irony. Her poem Dröm, which was given as a response to the admiration from the Academy in 1797, and in which she describe herself as unworthy, has also been interpreted as ironic in this regard.

Anna Maria Lenngren was a supporter of the realistic and scientific views of the age on enlightenment and disliked religion, sometimes interpreted as a protest against the religious environment of her childhood home. She had radical views on Sweden's class system, opposed the privileges of the nobility, and defended the rights of the "third estate" or working class against oppression. She criticized the snobbery of the nobility, the humble admiration their servants gave them and the anxious bowing of the working class, and portrayed the male members of the upper class as cold and merciless and the female members as snobby and ridiculous. A realist, she idealized "the third class", was inspired by the French Revolution. Above all, she fought for the intellectual freedom of women; that also women should be allowed to have opinions, and criticized male double standards.

Legacy

Anna Maria Lenngren is one of the most famous poets in the history of Sweden. Her production has made her one of the few 18th-century Swedish poets who are still commonly read, and she has been published a number of times after her death during the 19th, 20th and 21st centuries.

In accordance with her instructions, her collected poems were published after her death by her widower under the name  ("Attempts at Poetry"). After its publication, the Royal Swedish Academy had a memorial medal made with the inscription: "The less she sought fame, the more she gained it".

Her correspondence with her personal friend Gustaf af Leopold from 1795 to 1798 has been published.

In fiction
Anna Maria Lenngren is portrayed in the novel  ("Chamber-pot child") by Anna Laestadius Larsson from 2014, where she, alongside Ulrika Pasch, Ulrika Widström, Jeanna von Lantingshausen, Marianne Ehrenström and Sophie von Fersen, becomes a member in a Blue Stockings Society organized by the Queen of Sweden and Norway, Hedvig Elisabeth Charlotte of Holstein-Gottorp.

Works
Poems
 , Upsala, 1772
 , Upsala veckotidningar, 1772, Upsala
 , Upsala, 1774
 , Upsala vecko-tidning, 1774
 
 , Uppsala, 1775
  Uppsala, 1778
 Impromptu, Lunds vecko-blad, 1775
 , Stockholm, 1777
 , 1778
 , 1798
 , 1819
  (The Portraits)
  (Visit from the Countess)
  (Miss Juliana)
  (His Grace's morning snooze)
  (The Boys)
  (The happy party)
  (Advice to my dear daughter, if I had one) 1794
  (Other fabrics, Other customs!)

Prose

Translations
 J F Marmontel: Lucile operetta, 1776
 , Comedie ballet, 1778
 , Heroide, 1778
 C-S Favart: Arsene, comedie, 1779
 O Wolff: , 1819

See also
 Sophia Elisabet Brenner

Further reading
 Anna Maria Lenngren – Svenskt biografiskt handlexikon
 Anna Maria Lenngren – Nordisk Familjebok (2nd edition)

References

External links
 Samlade Skaldeförsök – Anna Maria Lenngren's collected works

Swedish-language writers
Swedish women poets
Swedish women's rights activists
Deaths from breast cancer
Deaths from cancer in Sweden
1754 births
1817 deaths
People from Uppsala
Writers from Stockholm
Swedish salon-holders
18th-century Swedish women writers
18th-century Swedish writers
Translators from French
Translators to Swedish
Members of the Royal Society of Sciences and Letters in Gothenburg
18th-century translators